Somewhere in the Real World is the third studio album by Australian artist, Vanessa Amorosi. It was released in Australia on 24 May 2008.

Background
The album was recorded in Los Angeles in 2007. Amorosi said "I think this album represents me finally. When I listen to "Absolutely Everybody" and "Shine" now, I sound like a baby, because I was a baby. Somewhere in the Real World represents who I am now and I believe it's still recognisable. You can't change your soul, but I have matured and have had life experiences that brought out these songs 
I took a long time making sure that every song on the album meant something to me. I wanted it to be one of those albums you buy, where you listen to it from the beginning to the end and it takes you on a journey. Somewhere in the Real World is a journal of what I've been doing." Amorosi explained why her album is titled Somewhere in the Real World saying "As an entertainer and as a person, I am always searching for what is real."

Singles
"Kiss Your Mama!" was released as the first single from the album on 8 September 2007. It reached the top twenty of the ARIA Singles Chart. "Perfect" was released as the album's second single in April 2008. The song peaked at number 4 on the ARIA singles chart, achieved  Platinum accreditation and was the most played Australian song on Australian radio for 2008. "Perfect" was used in the Seven Network's promotion for Bionic Woman. "The Simple Things (Something Emotional)" was released as the album's third single in September 2008 and peaked at number 36. Additionally, "Start It" was chosen by the Australian Football League (AFL) to be their theme song in 2008.

Critical reception

AllMusic editor Matthew Chisling called the album "infectious" and wrote. "Amorosi's impressive vocal range and sexy Anastacia-esque tone carry her to new heights on this versatile, accessible album of slick pop tracks and cooing ballads [...] The album boasts beyond-impressive maturity for a singer/songwriter of such a young age, and Somewhere in the Real World picks up from where her first major album, The Power, left off, establishing a pop star whose grace and maturity reflect dollops of potential. This is a truly impeccable album in terms of balancing credibility, poise, maturity, and all the other things that glorify a true pop artist.".

Chart performance
Somewhere in the Real World was scheduled for release in September 2007, but was delayed due to releases of follow pop artists' Delta Goodrem and Kylie Minogue. It debuted at four on the ARIA Albums Chart, becoming Amorosi's highest charting album since her debut, The Power.

Track listing

Charts

Weekly charts

Year-end charts

Certifications

Release history

References 

2008 albums
Vanessa Amorosi albums
Pop albums by Australian artists